Antonia Grigorova (born December 7, 1986, in Varna) is a Bulgarian cross-country skier who has competed since 2004. At the 2010 Winter Olympics in Vancouver, she finished 60th in the 10 km and 62nd in the 15 km mixed pursuit event. Four years later, at the Sochi Olympics, she represented her country in the 15 km cross-country skiing, finishing in 56th place.

At the FIS Nordic World Ski Championships 2009 in Liberec, Grigorova finished 54th in the 30 km, 67th in the individual sprint, 74th in the individual sprint, and was lapped in the 15 km mixed pursuit event.

Her best World Cup finish was 76th twice, both in 10 km events (2008, 2010).

References

External links

1986 births
Living people
Bulgarian female cross-country skiers
Cross-country skiers at the 2010 Winter Olympics
Cross-country skiers at the 2014 Winter Olympics
Cross-country skiers at the 2018 Winter Olympics
Olympic cross-country skiers of Bulgaria
Sportspeople from Varna, Bulgaria